Sudan is a city in Lamb County in Texas, United States. Its population was 958 at the 2010 census.

History

According to The Handbook of Texas, the area where the town is now located was once granted to the county in 1892 by the 77 Ranch, owned by S.B. Wilson and Wilson Furneaux. The town developed in 1917–1918 with a hotel and service from the Santa Fe railroad, which had built a branch line from Lubbock, Texas, to Texico, New Mexico, in 1913. The land company manager and first postmaster, P.E. Boesen, suggested the town's name in 1918.  A gin was built in 1922 and a bank established a year later. The town was incorporated in 1925, when the population was 600, up from a population of only 15 in 1920. The first of several grain elevators was also erected in 1925 and the Sudan News began publication. The population was 1,014 in 1930, 1,336 in 1950, 976 in 1970, and 1,091 in 1980. In 1990, it was 983. The population reached 1,039 in 2000.

Geography

Sudan is located at  (34.0678644, –102.5243624).

Demographics

2020 census

As of the 2020 United States census, 940 people, 454 households, and 345 families were residing in the city.

2000 census
As of the census of 2000,  1,039 people, 410 households, and 293 families resided in the city. The population density was 1,145.3 people per square mile (440.8/km). The 460 housing units averaged 507.1 per square mile (195.2/km). The racial makeup of the city was 74.11% White, 5.39% African American, 0.19% Native American, 18.86% from other races, and 1.44% from two or more races. Hispanics or Latinos of any race were 29.93% of the population.

Of the 410 households, 33.2% had children under 18 living with them, 58.8% were married couples living together, 9.3% had a female householder with no husband present, and 28.5% were not families. About 26.8% of all households were made up of individuals, and 18.5% had someone living alone who was 65 years of age or older. The average household size was 2.53 and the average family size was 3.07.

In the city, the population was distributed as 28.8% under 18, 6.8% from 18 to 24, 24.0% from 25 to 44, 22.5% from 45 to 64, and 17.9% who were 65 or older. The median age was 38 years. For every 100 females, there were 83.2 males. For every 100 females age 18 and over, there were 81.8 males.

The median income for a household in the city was $31,736, and for a family was $37,679. Males had a median income of $30,288 versus $22,500 for females. The per capita income for the city was $17,727. About 14.5% of families and 16.2% of the population were below the poverty line, including 19.9% of those under age 18 and 20.0% of those age 65 or over.

Education
The City of Sudan is served by the Sudan Independent School District.

Sudan High School has been designated a U.S. Department of Education National Blue Ribbon School.  Sudan ISD is also a Texas Education Agency Exemplary ranked campus, and has received multiple Bronze designations in U.S. News & World Reports annual "America's Best High Schools" feature. Sudan High School continues to have success in both curricular and extracurricular events and has won numerous state championships in both sports and academics.

Notable people

 Vendyl Jones (1930–2010), Noahide scholar who directed archaeological searches for artifacts such as the Ark of the Covenant, an inspiration for the movie character "Indiana Jones"

 Taylor Whitley (1980–2018), NFL player for the Miami Dolphins, Denver Broncos, and Washington Redskins

See also
Sudan
Earth, Texas
Llano Estacado
Plant X

References

External links

Handbook of Texas: Sudan, TX

Cities in Lamb County, Texas
Cities in Texas